The UCF Knights women's basketball team represents the University of Central Florida located in Orlando, Florida in the National Collegiate Athletic Association (NCAA) Division I and the American Athletic Conference (The American). The Knights play their home games at Addition Financial Arena located on the university's main campus. Sytia Messer was named head coach on April 3, 2022.

The Knights have participated in the NCAA/AIAW Tournament eight times, five as a Division I team and three times as a Division II program. The Knights reached the Elite Eight in 1982, and won the 1980 AIAW Division-II Florida State Championship, before losing their first game in the national tournament.

History

UCF first competed in AIAW during the 1977–78 season as a Division II team. During the 1979–80 season, the Knights had a record of 23–9 and won the AIAW D–II Small College Florida State Championship. Although the college was a member of the Sunshine State Conference, it did not organize a women's basketball team within the conference until 1981. They moved up to AIAW Division I in 1981–82, the last year of AIAW, and advanced to the Division I Tournament quarterfinals.

They moved to the NCAA during the 1982–83 season, initially in Division II, along with the rest of the Sunshine State Conference. They were promoted to Division I during 1984–85 season. During the three years the team played in the Sunshine State Conference, the Knights won both the conference regular season title and the tournament title every year. During their first year in NCAA Division I, they had a 20–10 record, but were not given a tournament bid since they were a non-conference team that year.

The team would struggle in Division I New South Women's Athletic Conference (NSWAC) until 1990. After playing in the American South Conference in 1990–91 season, which merged into the Sun Belt Conference soon after, the team landed in the Trans-American Athletic Conference (TAAC) during 1992–93 season. In 1995–96 season, the Knights surprised everybody by winning the TAAC Tournament, and making their first appearance in the NCAA women's basketball tournament (though they were eliminated in the first round).

In 1996–97 season, UCF hired Lynn Bria as their women's basketball head coach, and the team began to see more success. During the 1998–99 season, the Knights finally won the TAAC regular season title with a 13–3 record and the Conference tournament, allowing the team to enter the NCAA Tournament a second time. After their NCAA Tournament ouster, Bria was replaced as head coach by Gail Striegler.

After two years of struggling, Striegler put together a string of four winning seasons in what had become the Atlantic Sun Conference in the 2001–02 season. The team won the Atlantic Sun regular season title in 2002–03 and 2004–05, but failed to win the Conference tournament, and thus never played in the NCAA Tournament during those years.

In 2005–06, the Knights moved to Conference USA, and the women's basketball team struggled mightily, resulting in Striegler being fired and replaced by Joi Williams. The team continued to struggle in 2007–08 with a 10–20 record and a last place showing in the conference. But after a 2–11 start in 2008–09, they surprised C-USA by dominating, tying with four other teams with the second-best in-conference record of 11–5 (falling to the fifth seed due to their out-of-conference woes).  In the Conference USA Tournament, they beat Rice (66–64), Houston (79–66) and SMU (62–51) in order to face Southern Miss in the Championship game. After playing to a 52–52 tie in regulation, the Knights dominated the overtime period, 13–2, to win the game, 65–54. It was UCF's first C-USA title, allowing the team to enter the NCAA Tournament a third time.  Ranked No. 14 in the 2009 NCAA tournament, they surprised the No. 3 North Carolina Tar Heels, but ultimately lost 85–80.

After floundering during the 2009–10 season (10–15, 7–9), the Knights dominated the conference schedule in 2010–11 (22–10, 12–4), finishing 2nd in the regular season and winning their second C-USA title along with their fourth NCAA tournament appearance. The seasons afterwards, however, would bring struggles for the program, especially with the transition into the American Athletic Conference in 2013. After a 7–23 2015–16 season, Joi Williams was dismissed.

UCF would go on to hire Albany head coach Katie Abrahamson-Henderson. In her first year in 2016–17, Coach Abe would instantly improve the team with a 21–12 record as well as the program's first WNIT appearance where they would advance to the second round. In the 2018–19 season, UCF would go 26–7 and finish second place in the conference, only losing to UConn in the Tournament Championship. The Knights would have their first NCAA Tournament bid since 2010–11 that year, and their fifth overall. In 2020–21, UCF would finish second place in the conference, but would fall short to their rivals, USF. That season, UCF would make their sixth NCAA appearance.

The 2021–22 season would be record-breaking for UCF, with the Knights going 26–4 and being ranked in both polls for the first time in school history. UCF would also win their first regular season championship since 2004–05. In the AAC Tournament, UCF would beat Tulsa (69–54) and dominate SMU (61–28) before facing their rival, USF, in a championship rematch from the season before. After being down for 3 quarters, UCF would take over in the 4th quarter, at one point going on a 12–1 run, and win their first AAC Tournament title (53–45) as well as their first conference tournament victory since 2010–11, clinching a 7th NCAA Tournament appearance. Furthermore, in the NCAA Tournament, UCF would advance to the second round for the first time in school history with a 69–52 victory over Florida and fell just short to UConn, losing 52–47.

On March 26, 2022, Coach Abe left the Knights to take the head coach position at her alma mater, Georgia. She was replaced by Sytia Messer, the associate head coach at LSU and previously a head coach at Tennessee Tech. Messer won the national championship in 2019 as an assistant with Baylor, and made the Final Four as a player with Arkansas in 1998.

Postseason

NCAA Division I tournament results

NCAA Division II tournament results
The Knights, then known as the Golden Knights, made two appearances in the NCAA Division II women's basketball tournament. They had a combined record of 0–2.

Traditions

Knightmare

When the basketball program moved into the New UCF Arena in the fall of 2007, the facility could hold more students than ever before. To go along with its new facility and its new commitment to basketball, a new student section known as the "Knightmare" was formed. The "Knightmare" debuted on January 11, 2008 during a men's basketball game. Adorned in their black Knightmare shirts, the students completely filled the bleachered section behind the basket and the overflow section in the upper deck.

One of UCF's most unusual basketball traditions is its free throw chant. Started by students in the 1990s, UCF fans started by holding their right arms with clenched fists almost straight up when a UCF player shoots a free throw. When the basketball is made, the fans would stomp their right foot twice, clap their hands twice, make a shooting motion with their right hand while chanting "woosh." In recent years, after the appropriately named Stomp Stomp, Clap Clap, Woosh chant, fans would chant U-C-F afterwards, making a U, a C, and an F over their heads. During the 2010–2011 season, a group of students started a new tradition; if a UCF player makes all of his/her free throws, the chant would be followed by "ballin".

There is also another tradition where if the opponent goes for a shot and gets an "air ball," students would chant the entire game for that one player. It's been shown as an effective way to get into the player's mind.

Team record

See also
 UCF Knights men's basketball

References

External links

 

 
Basketball teams established in 1977
1977 establishments in Florida